1920 was the 27th season of County Championship cricket in England. There was no Test cricket as the post-war recovery continued.  Middlesex rose from 13th in 1919 to win the championship as the first of two back-to-back titles. Worcestershire returned to the championship after opting out in 1919.

Honours
County Championship - Middlesex
Minor Counties Championship - no competition
Wisden - Plum Warner

County Championship

Leading batsmen 
Patsy Hendren topped the averages with 2520 runs @ 61.46, just ahead of Jack Hobbs who scored 2827 @ 58.89.

Leading bowlers 
Jack Hobbs topped the bowling averages taking 17 wickets.  The leading full-time bowler was Wilfred Rhodes with 161 wickets @ 13.18.

References

Annual reviews
 Wisden Cricketers' Almanack 1921

External links
 CricketArchive – season summary

1920 in English cricket
English cricket seasons in the 20th century